Neochalcosia remota is a moth in the family Zygaenidae. It is found in China (Sichuan, Shaanxi, Gansu), Korea, Japan and Taiwan. The habitat consists of parks and areas with Quercus species.

The wingspan is 50–55 mm.

The larvae feed on Symplocos species.

References

Moths described in 1862
Chalcosiinae
Moths of Asia